

278001–278100 

|-bgcolor=#f2f2f2
| colspan=4 align=center | 
|}

278101–278200 

|-id=141
| 278141 Tatooine ||  || Tatooine is a desert planet in the fictional Star Wars universe. It is the home planet of Anakin and Luke Skywalker. || 
|-id=197
| 278197 Touvron ||  || Guy Touvron (born 1950), a French Classical trumpet player and music teacher || 
|-id=200
| 278200 Olegpopov ||  || Oleg Popov (1930–2016), a famous Russian circus artist || 
|}

278201–278300 

|-id=225
| 278225 Didierpelat ||  || Didier Pelat (born 1948) is an astronomer at Paris Observatory, who has worked on spectroscopy and modelling of active galactic nuclei, hydrodynamics of accretion disks and stellar populations synthesis. He has also designed an iterative Bracewell interferometer extending the nulling effect to a large bandwidth. || 
|}

278301–278400 

|-id=384
| 278384 Mudanjiang ||  || The Chinese city of Mudanjiang, located in the country's northernmost province of Heilongjiang || 
|-id=386
| 278386 Sofivanna ||  || Twins Sofia and Ivanna (born 2007) are the grandchildren of Boris Romanyuk, Professor at the V. Ye. Lashkaryov Institute of Semiconductor Physics of the National Academy of Sciences of Ukraine. || 
|}

278401–278500 

|-id=447
| 278447 Saviano ||  || Roberto Saviano (born 1979), an Italian journalist, writer and essayist || 
|}

278501–278600 

|-id=513
| 278513 Schwope ||  || Axel Schwope (born 1959), a German astronomer at the Leibniz Institute for Astrophysics in Potsdam || 
|-id=591
| 278591 Salò ||  || The historic town of Salò on the western bank of Lake Garda in northern Italy || 
|}

278601–278700 

|-id=609
| 278609 Avrudenko ||  || Anatoliy Viktorovych Rudenko (born 1955), a Ukrainian scientist and surgeon || 
|-id=645
| 278645 Kontsevych ||  || Yevgen Vasylyovych Kontsevych (1935–2010) was a Ukrainian novelist and short story writer. In his works he often compared people's relationships with the behavior of birds and wild animals, preferring communication with the latter, rather than with the deceptive and treacherous-by-nature humans. || 
|}

278701–278800 

|-id=735
| 278735 Kamioka ||  || The Kamioka Observatory, Institute for Cosmic Ray Research is a neutrino physics laboratory located underground of the city of Hida in Gifu Prefecture, Japan. || 
|}

278801–278900 

|-bgcolor=#f2f2f2
| colspan=4 align=center | 
|}

278901–279000 

|-id=956
| 278956 Shei-Pa ||  || Shei-Pa National Park is located in the central part of Taiwan around the peaks of Hsuehshan and Dabajian Mountain, with an area of 76,850 hectares. There are 51 peaks over 3,000 meters high. || 
|-id=986
| 278986 Chenshuchu ||  || Chen Shu-chu, a vegetable vendor and philanthropist from Taitung in Eastern Taiwan || 
|}

References 

278001-279000